Spaliny may refer to the following places in Poland:

Spaliny Małe
Spaliny Wielkie